Koogiste is a village in Kehtna Parish, Rapla County in northern-central Estonia.  It had a station on the Tallinn - Pärnu railway line operated by Elron, which closed in December 2018.

References

 

Villages in Rapla County